Teke Peninsula, also known as Teke Region, is a peninsula located in southwestern Turkey between the gulfs of Antalya and Fethiye extending into the Mediterranean Sea. It is bordered to the Turkish Lakes Region in the north.

It was known as Lycia in ancient times. Its name comes from the Teke Tribe, a Turkmen tribe that settled in the region during the Sultanate of Rum.

The main streams of the region are Alakır Creek in the east and Eşen Creek in the west.

Remains of ancient cities in the region include Phaselis, Olympos, Arycanda, Myra, Xanthos, Letoon, Patara, Limyra.  Settlements such as Kemer, Elmalı, Kumluca, Finike, Demre (formerly: Kale), Kaş, Kalkan, Kınık are also important for tourism. Mount Güllük-Termessos National Park and Beydağları Coastal National Park are located on the peninsula.

See also
Lycian Way, -long hiking trail stretching  from Hisarönü (Ovacık, Fethiye), Muğla Province in the west to Geyikbayırı, Konyaaltı, Antalya Province in the east

References

Peninsulas of Turkey
Landforms of the Mediterranean Sea
Landforms of Muğla Province
Landforms of Antalya Province